Saint-Michel-de-Napierville Aerodrome  is an aerodrome located  south of Saint-Michel-de-Napierville, Quebec, Canada

References 

Registered aerodromes in Montérégie
Les Jardins-de-Napierville Regional County Municipality